A partial lunar eclipse took place on Tuesday, March 24, 1959.

Visibility

Related lunar eclipses

Lunar year series

Saros series

Half-Saros cycle
A lunar eclipse will be preceded and followed by solar eclipses by 9 years and 5.5 days (a half saros). This lunar eclipse is related to two solar eclipses of Solar Saros 119.

See also
List of lunar eclipses
List of 20th-century lunar eclipses

Notes

External links

1959-03
1959 in science
March 1959 events